This is a list of bridges and other crossings of the Arkansas River starting from the mouth at the Mississippi River upstream to its source in Colorado.

Crossings

See also

 List of crossings of the Lower Mississippi River
 McClellan–Kerr Arkansas River Navigation System

External links

Arkansas River
Arkansas River
Arkansas River
Arkansas River
Arkansas River